Özge Özpirinçci (born 1 April 1986) is a Turkish television and movie actress.

She began her acting career with the TV series Cesaretin Var mı Aşka and Kavak Yelleri Turkish remake of Dawson's Creek.

Her breakthrough came with a leading role in popular youth series "Melekler Korusun". She then played in surreal series "Yakamoz S-245" with Alper Saldıran and Kadın Turkish remake of "Woman" with Hümeyra for twice. With Caner Cindoruk, she played in "Kadın" and "Aramızda Kalsın". With Buğra Gülsoy, she played in romantic comedies "Aşk Yeniden", "Acı Tatlı Ekşi".

She also starred in Al Yazmalım based classic novel and web series "İlk ve Son". She played in period comedy drama "Deli Saraylı". She appeared in series that remake of old Turkish films "Tatar Ramazan", "Ağır Roman Yeni Dünya" and popular series "Fi".

Özpirinçci starred in feature film  Turkish Air Force film Anadolu Kartalları. She performed as Fikriye in film "Veda". Her short film The Loss won multiple awards at international film festivals. She also hosted a television program called Toplu Hayat.

Filmography

Film

Web series

Television

Music videos

References

External links 
 
 

1986 births
Living people
Turkish television actresses
Turkish film actresses
Actresses from Istanbul
Golden Butterfly Award winners